Lancaster is a city in Fairfield County, Ohio, in the south-central part of the state. As of the 2020 census, the city population was 40,552. It is the county seat of Fairfield County.

History 
The earliest known inhabitants of the southeastern and central Ohio region were the Hopewell, Adena, and Fort Ancient Native Americans, of whom little evidence survived, beyond the burial and ceremonial mounds built throughout the Ohio and Mississippi Valleys.  Many mounds and burial sites have also yielded archaeological artifacts. Serpent Mound and Hopewell Culture National Historical Park, though not in Fairfield County, are nearby.

Before and immediately after European settlement, the land today comprising Lancaster and Fairfield County was inhabited by the Shawnee, nations of the Iroquois, Wyandot, and other Native American tribes. It served as a natural crossroads for the inter- and intra-tribal wars fought at various times. Frontier explorer Christopher Gist reached Lancaster's vicinity on January 19, 1751, when he visited the small Delaware town of Hockhocking nearby. Leaving the area the next day, Gist rode southwest to Maguck, another Delaware town near Circleville.

Having been ceded to the United States by Great Britain after the American Revolution in the Treaty of Paris, the lands north of the Ohio River and west of the Appalachian Mountains were incorporated into the Northwest Territory in 1787. White settlers began to encroach on Native American lands in the Northwest Territory.  As the new United States government began to cast its eye westward, the stage was set for the series of campaigns that culminated in the Battle of Fallen Timbers in 1794 and the Treaty of Greenville in 1795. With pioneer settlement within Ohio made legal and safe from Indian raids, developers began to speculate in land sales in earnest.

As part of the deal, Zane was awarded square-mile tracts of land at the points where his trace crossed the Hocking, Muskingum, and Scioto Rivers. Zane's Trace, as it is now known, was completed by 1797. As Zane's sons began to carve the square-mile tract astride the Hocking into saleable plots, the village of Lancaster was founded in 1800. Lancaster antedated the formal establishment of the state of Ohio by three years. Many villages and townships right outside Lancaster, such as Lithopolis, Royalton, and Greencastle, were settled around the same time, which contributed to the village's success.

Initially known as New Lancaster, and later shortened by city ordinance (1805), the town quickly grew; formal incorporation as a city came in 1831. The connection of the Hocking Canal to the Ohio and Erie Canal in this era provided a way for the region's rich agricultural produce to reach eastern markets.

The initial settlers were predominantly German immigrants and their descendents, many from Lancaster, Pennsylvania. Ohio's longest continuously operating newspaper, the Lancaster Eagle-Gazette, was born of a merger of the early Ohio Adler, founded around 1807, with the Ohio Gazette, founded in the 1830s. The two papers were ferocious competitors since they were on opposite sides of the American Civil War, with the Adler antislavery and pro-Union. The city also had numerous migrants from the Upper South who sympathized with the Confederacy. The papers merged in 1937, 72 years after the war's end. This was shortly after the Gazette was acquired by glassmaker Anchor-Hocking. The newspaper is currently part of the Newspaper Network of Central Ohio, a unit of Gannett Company, Inc.

Geography
Lancaster is located at  (39.7193, -82.6053).

Climate

Demographics

The city's median household income was $44,794 and median family income was $59,930. Males had a median income of $36,169 versus $24,549 for females. The city's per capita income was $25,230. About 12.0% of all families (4.4% of married-couple families), and 16.3% of the population were below the poverty line, including 22.0% of those under age 18 and 10.0% of those over 65.

2020 census 
As of the census of 2020, 40,438 people, 16,451 households, and 9,951 families were residing in the city. The population density was 2,058.3 people per square mile (755.0/km2). The 18,250 housing units had an average density of 879.6 per square mile (339.5/km2). The racial makeup of the city was 92.5% White, 1.8% African American, 0.3% Asian, 0.20% Native American, 0.2% from other races, and 5.0% from two or more races. Hispanics or Latinos of any race were 1.8% of the population.

Of the 16,451 households, 30.9% had children under 18 living with them, 43.7% were married couples living together, 12.9% had a female householder with no husband present, and 39.5% were not families. About 31.3% of all households were made up of individuals, and 15.3% had someone living alone who was 65 or older. The average household size was 2.39, and the average family size was 2.97.

In the city, the age distribution was 22.3% under 18, and 17.4% who were 65 or older. The median age was 39.2 years. For every 100 females, there were 92.3 males. For every 100 females 18 and over, there were 88.6 males.

2010 census
As of the census of 2010,  38,780 people, 16,048 households, and 9,937 families resided in the city. The population density was 1,955.9 people per square mile (755.0/km2). The 17,685 housing units had an average density of 879.6 per square mile (339.5/km2). The racial makeup of the city was 95.9% White, 1.0% African American, 0.5% Asian, 0.30% Native American,  0.6% from other races, and 1.7% from two or more races. Hispanics or Latinos of any race were 1.6% of the population.

Of the 16,048 households, 27.8% had children under 18 living with them, 42.4% were married couples living together, 14.2% had a female householder with no husband present, and 38.1% were not families. About 31.7% of all households were made up of individuals, and 13.8% had someone living alone who was 65 or older. The average household size was 2.36, and the average family size was 2.95.

In the city, the age distribution was 24% under the age of 18 and 15.7% who were 65 or older. The median age was 37.5 years. For every 100 females, there were 92.3 males. For every 100 females age 18 and over, there were 88.6 males.

Economy

Top employers
According to the city's 2021 Comprehensive Annual Financial Report, Lancaster's top employers are:

Arts and culture
Lancaster is home to the Fairfield County Fair, a weeklong fair and the last (88th) county fair in Ohio each year, always in the second week of October. It features a variety of attractions, including truck, tractor, and horse pulls, demolition derbies, concerts, bands, and horse races. The Fairfield County Fair also includes food, animals, exhibits, games, and rides for people of all ages.

AHA! A Hands-on Adventure  
AHA! is a children's museum founded in 2006. Its mission is to provide a hands-on, interactive, playful, and educational environment that invites curiosity, allows exploration, encourages participation, and celebrates the child-like wonder in everyone.

Georgian Museum
Originally built in 1832 for the Maccracken Family, this Federal-style home is constructed predominantly of brick and local limestone. Converted into a museum, it is now furnished as it would have been in the 1830s with some original pieces and numerous early Fairfield County items. Located in one of Lancaster's three national historic districts, the structure mixes elements of American, Georgian, and Regency architecture.

The Decorative Arts Center of Ohio
The Decorative Arts Center of Ohio is a nonprofit museum whose mission is to foster knowledge and appreciation of the decorative arts, celebrate the architecture and heritage of the Reese-Peters House, and enhance historic Lancaster's vitality and integrity. It provides exhibitions, public programs, art classes, and workshops for all ages, and a focus for research and communication about the decorative arts of Ohio.

Ohio Glass Museum
Opened in 2002, the Ohio Glass Museum is in historic downtown Lancaster and dedicated to recording the history of the glass industry, which for over 100 years has been one of the mainstays of Fairfield County's economy.

Sherman House

Lancaster was the birthplace of Civil War General William Tecumseh Sherman and his brother, Senator John Sherman. The house where they were born, built in 1811, has been converted into a museum, housing articles related to General Sherman's life and Civil War artifacts. The Sherman family expanded the frame house in 1816 and again, with an additional brick front, in 1870.

Robert K Fox Family YMCA Swim Team
The Robert K Fox Family YMCA Swim Team (LYST, or Lancaster YMCA Swim Team), is a competitive, year-round swim team coached by Axel Birnbrich and a team of experienced assistant coaches. Birnbirch is in his 39th year of coaching and his second year at LYST. The team has swimmers from ages 5–18 and around 130 members per year. They regularly attend the YMCA Short Course and Long Course national meets.  They are also a USA Swimming team, attending many USA meets per season.

Shopping
The city's main shopping district is centered around River Valley Mall, or downtown Lancaster.

Education
Lancaster City School District operates Lancaster High School. Lancaster has a public library, a branch of the Fairfield County District Library. Additionally, Ohio University-Lancaster is a branch campus of Ohio University that operates in the area.

Media
Lancaster has a daily newspaper, the Lancaster Eagle-Gazette.

Lancaster has a monthly magazine, the Lancaster Living Magazine, published by Cher Jaurigue.

Notable people
Lancaster is the birthplace and/or hometown of:
 Allan Anderson, Major League pitcher, American League ERA leader 1988
 Mark Baltz, NFL official, 1989–present
 Jim Brideweser, Major League Baseball player
 Bobby Carpenter, NFL player Dallas Cowboys, Miami Dolphins, Detroit Lions, New England Patriots
 Rob Carpenter, NFL player, New York Giants, Houston Oilers
 Gene Cole, 1952 Olympic silver medalist - 4 x 400 metre relay
 Jim Cordle, NFL player, New York Giants
 Hugh Boyle Ewing, Union Army Major General
 Thomas Ewing, first Secretary of the Interior, appointed by President Zachary Taylor
 Thomas Ewing, Jr., Union Army brigadier general, defender of Abraham Lincoln assassination conspirators, Samuel Mudd, Edmund Spangler, and Samuel Arnold
 Malcolm Forbes, publisher of Forbes magazine who ran a local Lancaster newspaper in 1941 
 Bill Glassford, football player and coach
 David Graf, actor, is best known as Sgt. Eugene Tackleberry in the Police Academy series of films.
 Robert G. Heft, designer of the current 50-star flag of the United States adopted by the Congress in 1960
 Edward Gerard Hettinger, auxiliary bishop of the Roman Catholic Diocese of Columbus
 James A. Hill, retired U.S. Air Force general and former vice chief of staff of the Air Force
 George King Hunter, U.S. Army brigadier general, born in Lancaster
 Rex Kern, football quarterback, Ohio State Buckeyes football 1968 national championship team, All-American, College Football Hall of Fame (2007); played defensive back for the NFL's Buffalo Bills and Baltimore Colts
 Brannon Kidder, professional middle-distance runner
 Augustus Roy Knabenshue, American aeronautical engineer and aviator, manager of Wright Exhibition Team
 James A. Lantz, lawyer and Ohio state legislator
 Clarence E. Miller, a Republican congressman from Ohio, serving January 3, 1967 to January 3, 1993
 Dr. Marc Wolfgang Miller, author, explorer, known for his cryptozoology expeditions
 Mary Murphy, ballroom dance champion, accredited dance judge, and a regular judge and choreographer on the television show So You Think You Can Dance
 Joe Ogilvie, PGA golfer
 Richard F. Outcault, cartoonist and creator of Yellow Kid and Buster Brown, also known as the "Father of the American Comic Strip"
 Jacob Parrott, first recipient of the Medal of Honor
 Cora Rigby, first woman at a major paper to head a Washington news bureau, co-founder of the Women's National Press Club.
 John Sherman, U.S. senator, Secretary of State and Secretary of the Treasury; principal author of the Sherman Antitrust Act
 William Tecumseh Sherman, Union Army and U.S. Army general and General of the Army of the United States from 1869 to 1883
 Henry Stanbery, Attorney General, defender of President Andrew Johnson at his impeachment trial
Rebecca Harrell Tickell, actress, best known as Jessica Riggs in the 1989 film Prancer
 Patricia A. Weitsman, international relations scholar

References

External links
 City website
 Fairfield County Visitors & Convention Bureau

County seats in Ohio
Cities in Ohio
Cities in Fairfield County, Ohio
Populated places established in 1800
German-American culture in Ohio
English-American culture in Ohio
1800 establishments in the Northwest Territory